Events in the year 1977 in Brazil.

Incumbents

Federal government
 President: General Ernesto Geisel 
 Vice President: General Adalberto Pereira dos Santos

Governors 
 Acre: vacant
 Alagoas: Divaldo Suruagy  
 Amazonas: Henoch da Silva Reis
 Bahia: Roberto Santos 
 Ceará: José Adauto Bezerra 
 Espírito Santo: Élcio Álvares 
 Goiás: Irapuan Costa Jr. 
 Maranhão: Oswaldo da Costa Nunes Freire  
 Mato Grosso: Jose Garcia Neto 
 Mato Grosso do Sul: vacant
 Minas Gerais: Aureliano Chaves 
 Pará: Aloysio Chaves 
 Paraíba: Ivan Bichara 
 Paraná: Jaime Canet Júnior 
 Pernambuco: Francisco Moura Cavalcanti 
 Piauí: Dirceu Arcoverde 
 Rio de Janeiro: Floriano P. Faria Lima
 Rio Grande do Norte: Tarcisio de Vasconcelos Maia 
 Rio Grande do Sul: Sinval Sebastião Duarte Guazzelli 
 Santa Catarina: Antônio Carlos Konder Reis 
 São Paulo: Paulo Egídio Martins 
 Sergipe: José Rollemberg

Vice governors
 Acre: Omar Sabino de Paula 
 Alagoas: vacant
 Amazonas: João Bosco Ramos de Lima 
 Bahia: Edvaldo Brandão Correia 
 Ceará: José Waldemar de Alcântara e Silva 
 Espírito Santo: Carlos Alberto Lindenberg von Schilgen 
 Goiás: José Luís Bittencourt 
 Maranhão: José Duailibe Murad 
 Mato Grosso: Cássio Leite de Barros 
 Mato Grosso do Sul: vacant
 Minas Gerais: Levindo Ozanam Coelho 
 Pará: Clovis Silva de Morais Rego 
 Paraíba: Dorgival Terceiro Neto 
 Paraná: Octávio Cesário Pereira Júnior 
 Pernambuco: Paulo Gustavo de Araújo Cunha 
 Piauí: Djalma Martins Veloso 
 Rio de Janeiro: vacant
 Rio Grande do Norte: Geraldo Melo 
 Rio Grande do Sul: José Augusto Amaral de Sousa 
 Santa Catarina: Marcos Henrique Büechler 
 São Paulo: Ferreira Filho 
 Sergipe: Antônio Ribeiro Sotelo

Events
 President Geisel closes Congress briefly to control presidential succession as conflict erupted between Geisel, the duristas, Congress, the Church, and the media.

Births
27 March – Vítor Meira race car driver
8 November - João Rodrigo Silva Santos soccer player (d. 2013)

Deaths
 21 July – Zózimo, World Cup-winning footballer (b. 1932)

See also 
 1977 in Brazilian football
 Brazilian military government

References

See also 
1977 in Brazilian football
1977 in Brazilian television

 
1970s in Brazil
Years of the 20th century in Brazil
Brazil
Brazil